Bryanston East is a wealthy, upper class suburb of Johannesburg, South Africa. It is one of the wealthiest suburbs in South Africa. It borders the suburbs of Rivonia, Riverclub, Morningside Manor and Sandton. It is in Region 3.

References

Johannesburg Region E